Irixoa is a municipality of northwestern Spain in the province of A Coruña, in the autonomous community of Galicia. It belongs to the comarca of Betanzos. Irixoa has a population of 1,502 inhabitants (INE, 2008).

References

Municipalities in the Province of A Coruña